The Sam Cooley Barn is a historic barn, located just outside Bald Knob, Arkansas south of Collins Road.  It is a two-story frame structure in a transverse crib configuration, with a metal roof, vertical board walls, and a stone pier foundation.  Its main drive is oriented east–west, with the main vehicle entrance on the west, topped by a sliding door at the second level to allow tall equipment into the barn, and an animal entrance on the north side.  Built about 1920, it is one of the best-preserved barns of that period in White County.

The barn was listed on the National Register of Historic Places in 1992.

See also
National Register of Historic Places listings in White County, Arkansas

References

Barns on the National Register of Historic Places in Arkansas
Buildings and structures completed in 1920
Buildings and structures in Bald Knob, Arkansas
National Register of Historic Places in White County, Arkansas
1920 establishments in Arkansas